What a Time to Be Alive is the eleventh studio album by the American indie rock band Superchunk. It was released in February 2018 by Merge Records.

Track listing

Personnel
 Mac McCaughan - vocals, guitar, cover art
 Laura Ballance - bass, cover art
 Jim Wilbur - guitar
 Jon Wurster - drums
 Sabrina Ellis - vocals on “Break the Glass” 
 Stephin Merritt - vocals on “Erasure” 
 Katie Crutchfield - vocals on “Erasure” 
 David Bazan - vocals on “Cloud of Hate” 
 Skylar Gudasz - vocals on “Black Thread” 
 Beau Sorenson - recording
 Matthew Barnhart - mastering
 Lissa Gotwals - photography

Charts

References

2018 albums
Superchunk albums
Merge Records albums